Dudley Brooks (December 22, 1913 – July 17, 1989) was an American jazz pianist, arranger, and composer.

Biography
Brooks was born on December 22, 1913, in Los Angeles, California. 
While under contract to Paramount Studios, Brooks spent considerable time working as a session piano player at the Radio Recorders studio in Los Angeles. For many years, Radio Recorders was one of the best known recording studios in the country and hosted performers such as Charlie Parker, Louis Armstrong, and Elvis Presley. Presley was also under contract to Paramount Studios where he was filming movies to include Girls! Girls! Girls! and Blue Hawaii. Paramount, to ensure Presley's recordings and movies stayed on schedule, regularly provided studio musicians to Radio Recorders. As a result, Brooks developed a professional relationship with Presley that spanned decades. Together, they collaborated on many albums and movies to include:

 A Date with Elvis
 Blue Hawaii
 Elvis for Everyone
 Elvis' Gold Records Volume 4
 Elvis Sings Flaming Star
 Elvis' Christmas Album
 Fun in Acapulco
 G.I. Blues
 Girls! Girls! Girls!
 It Happened at the World's Fair
 Kid Galahad (movie soundtrack)
 Jailhouse Rock
 Let's Be Friends
 Loving You
 Peace in the Valley
 Pot Luck
 Roustabout
 Something for Everybody
 Viva Las Vegas (movie soundtrack)
 Wild in the Country (movie soundtrack)

Brooks, one of several African Americans who worked with Presley, downplayed allegations that Presley was a racist.

During his career, Brooks also composed a number of songs often in collaboration with other songwriters. Among his works is the well-known Christmas song "(Everybody's Waitin' For) The Man with the Bag". Made popular by Kay Starr in 1950, the song has been covered by many artists to include the Brian Setzer Orchestra and Vonda Shepard.

Brooks died in his hometown of Los Angeles in 1989.

See also
 List of jazz arrangers

References

1913 births
1989 deaths
Musicians from Los Angeles
20th-century jazz composers
African-American jazz composers
American jazz composers
African-American jazz musicians
Jazz arrangers
20th-century American composers
20th-century African-American musicians